Hydronic balancing, also called hydraulic balancing, is the process of optimizing the distribution of water in a building's hydronic heating or cooling system by equalizing the system pressure to provide the intended indoor climate at optimum energy efficiency and minimal operating cost.

To provide the correct power output, heating or cooling devices require a certain flow known as the design flow. Theoretically, it is possible to design plants that deliver the design flow at each terminal unit (heating or cooling device). In reality, this is not possible because pipes and valves only come in certain sizes. Moreover, predicting the real flow in a system accurately is too complex. Some circuits (typically those closest to the pump) will be favored by higher than required flows at the expense of other circuits that will have underflows.

In small heating systems (e.g. domestic systems) balancing is quite easy because of the small number of terminal units and relatively simple distribution network. Balancing can normally be achieved by simply pre-setting the flow through the radiators.

Larger buildings, such as offices or hospitals, have more complicated heating and cooling systems and require a more accurate balancing technique.  To obtain a plant with the correct design flows, consultants design systems to include balancing valves, differential pressure controllers or pressure independent control valves. 
Balancing valves allow the measurement of differential pressures which can be used to calculate a flow. There are various balancing methods, but all involve measuring differential pressures and adjusting them to the correct value by calculating the flow which represents.

Differential pressure controllers are usually membrane- or spring driven valves that control the differential pressures in the installation. This will simplify balancing procedures and enable the installation to be more precisely controlled.
Pressure independent valves combine the balancing and control functions in one valve and work based on springs and/or membranes to precisely control the flows in the distribution network and as such need no measuring or balancing procedure.

The reason for balancing the system 
In a balanced system every radiator is set to receive the proper amount of fluid as designed in order to generate the required amount of heat.

It is important to make sure that, when the room thermostat is calling for heat, all the radiators in the system heat up fully - to the maximum temperature possible - in sitting rooms and other daily "living" rooms but NOT in the other rooms (utility rooms, bedrooms, bathrooms, etc.) which should be kept as cool as possible. This is easy to do if you have TRVs (thermostatically-controlled radiator valves) fitted to your radiators, but if you don't have TRVs, you should be sure to open the IN-FLOW valves fully in all living rooms and turn them almost fully off in the other rooms. (Keeping them open just an eighth- to a quarter- turn usually works.)

When it gets cold outside many people go round the house to open both valves on their radiators fully, in the mistaken belief that they will get more heat. But all that does is un-balance the system. The result is that the radiators nearest to the boiler take most of the flow of hot water and the other radiators get very little flow at all. If the system is unbalanced, some rooms get too hot and others never get warm enough. Often the owners of unbalanced systems imagine this is because "the boiler is too old" or "the radiators are full of silt and need flushing out" and think that the cost of getting their system repaired would be so high that they do nothing about getting it fixed! Most often their problem will disappear if they call-in someone who knows how to balance all the radiators.

Instead of letting your central heating system cool down completely, so that you often have to keep switching it on for a short time to give your home a big blast of heat, it is best to keep your central heating running continuously with the central wall-mounted thermostat set at the lowest temperature at which you feel comfortable. Doing this could save you money because you will not be wasting so much fuel, especially if your home is well insulated.

Note: It is a sure sign that you have a faulty thermostat if you find that you continually have to turn the set temperature up by hand to get the system to start warming-up and then always have to turn that stat down

Problems caused by improper balance
In an unbalanced system there will always be favoured circuits that receive more water than they require.  These favoured circuits steal flow from unfavoured circuits which will not then be able to provide the heating or cooling required.  Control valves may temporarily help by gradually reducing the flow in favoured circuits, thus allowing unfavoured circuits to achieve the correct flow. This will however cause long delays in reaching the set temperature in the building after night setback and will make the installation very inefficient.

Balancing limits the flow in favoured circuits, forcing water through unfavoured circuits.  As a result, the required design flows are available to all circuits and the system can provide the required Indoor Air Quality.  Avoiding overflows means the pump is not doing unnecessary work which saves energy, reduces operating cost and can reduce the size of the pump required (saves on initial pump investment).  Balancing also saves energy and operating costs by reducing the amount of time between starting a plant and reaching the required indoor climate.  For example, after every set back unbalanced plants must start earlier and run at maximum capacity for longer than balanced plants thereby using more energy.

See also
Hydronics
Hydraulics

References

Heating, ventilation, and air conditioning